Sun Yat-sen Memorial Hall is a metro station in Taipei, Taiwan served by Taipei Metro. It is named after the nearby Sun Yat-sen Memorial Hall.

Station overview

This two-level, underground station consists of an island platform and five exits. It is located at the intersection of Zhongxiao East Rd. and Guangfu South Rd.

Due to crowding during New Year's festivities, automatic platform gates have been installed at this station.

History
24 December 1999: Opened for service with the opening of the Taipei City Hall←→Longshan Temple segment.

Station layout

Exits
Exit 1: No.327, Zhongxiao E. Rd. Sec. 4
Exit 2: No.304, Zhongxiao E. Rd. Sec. 4
Exit 3: Zhongxiao E. Rd. Sec. 4 and Guangfu S. Rd.
Exit 4: No.400, Zhongxiao E. Rd. Sec. 4 
Exit 5: No.345, Zhongxiao E. Rd. Sec. 4

Around the station
 Sun Yat-sen Memorial Hall
 Taipei International Convention Center
 Taipei Dome
 Fiscal Information Agency
 Songshan Cultural and Creative Park
 Chinese Television System
 Tourism Bureau
 National Property Administration
 The International Commercial Bank of China (between this station and Zhongxiao Dunhua station)
 Taiwan Railway Administration Taipei Railway Workshop
 Guangfu Elementary School

References

Bannan line stations
Railway stations opened in 1999
1999 establishments in Taiwan